Henry Monte Beville (February 24, 1875 – January 24, 1955), was a Major League Baseball (MLB) catcher and first basemen who played in 1903 and 1904. He played for the New York Highlanders and the Detroit Tigers. He had a .203 career batting average.

External links

1875 births
1955 deaths
People from Wayne County, Indiana
Major League Baseball catchers
Major League Baseball first basemen
Baseball players from Indiana
New York Highlanders players
Detroit Tigers players
Logansport Ottos players
Indianapolis Indians players
Grand Rapids Furniture Makers players
Springfield Wanderers players
Columbus Senators players
Indianapolis Hoosiers (minor league) players
Anderson Anders players
Toledo Mud Hens players
Kansas City Blues (baseball) players
Flint (minor league baseball) players
Providence Grays (minor league) players
Milwaukee Brewers (minor league) players
Rochester Bronchos players
Syracuse Stars (minor league baseball) players